Away from Rome! was a religious movement founded in Austria by the Pan-German politician Georg Ritter von Schönerer aimed at conversion of all the Roman Catholic German-speaking population of Austria to Lutheran Protestantism, or, in some cases, to the Old Catholic Churches. It was founded amid the ensuing Kulturkampf in Imperial Germany.

Origins 

"Away from Rome" (German: Los-von-Rom-Bewegung) was a religious movement founded in Austria around 1900, mostly politically influenced. This movement aimed at supporting change of confession from the Roman Catholic to either the Evangelical Lutheran or Old Catholic denomination. It was supported by German National forces. The slogan "Away from Rome" was coined by Theodor Georg Rakus, a medical student (who would later become Dr. Theodor Georg Rakus, physician and royal Swedish vice consul in Salzburg), and a companion of Georg von Schönerer.

Background: Greater German and German national ideas 

Since the time of Counterreformation among the Habsburgs, Austria was an almost exclusively Roman Catholic country. The Protestants only formed a vanishing minority. Only since emperor Joseph II's enactment of the Patent of Tolerance in 1781, the exercise of religion was granted again to Reformed Christians and Lutherans. After the foundation of the German Reich in 1871, causing the "lesser German solution", that is the unification of Germany under the control of Prussia excluding Austria, many Austrians still remained devoted to "Greater German ideas". The German Nationals strived for a close political connection to the German Reich, and partially even aimed at complete dissolution of the monarchy of the Habsburgs and the annexation of the parts that were populated by the Germans to the German Reich. One of the leading advocates of this political direction was Georg Ritter von Schönerer. In the program of Linz in 1882, the German Nationals established the slogan "not liberal, not clerical, but national", and opposed to the Jews, as well as to the political and societal influence of the Roman Catholic Church.

Starting point: Count Badeni's language decrees 
In 1897, the Language decrees issued by Prime Minister Count Badeni were enacted. The decrees ordered that civil servants of the crown lands Bohemia and Moravia should always be able to speak both German and Czech.  These decrees were vehemently opposed by a group of German nationalists (Deutschnationale), but were largely supported by the Austrian Catholic People's Party (Katholische Volkspartei) as well as by many Czech Catholic clerics. In reaction, the Nationalists promoted an oppositional movement that called for secession from Catholicism and resistance to its "alien" influence. (Schönerer's slogan "Ohne Juda, ohne Rom wird gebaut Germanias Dom" ("Without Jewry, without Rome, Germania's cathedral will be built") demonstrates a typical conflation of anti-Catholicism with xenophobia.) In a congregation of German nationalists in Vienna, the so-called "German National Congress" (Deutscher Volkstag), the nationalists called on the people to leave the Catholic Church and Schönerer and a group of followers coined the slogan "Away from Rome!" ("Los von Rom!").

The conversion movement was supported by Protestant organizations from Germany, especially by the "Gustavus Adolphus Association" (Gustav-Adolf-Verein) and the Protestant Federation (Evangelischer Bund) until 1905. Between January 1898 and March 1900 10,000 Austrians left the Catholic Church. More than 65,000 people joining the Protestant Church and more than 20,000 people joining the Old Catholic Church before the outbreak of World War I in 1914 were registered. As a result, many new Protestant rectories had to be installed. Nevertheless, not all conversions can be seen as a result of the "Away from Rome" movement; many of them were due to a general dissatisfaction with the Roman Catholic Church, which was largely viewed as anti-liberal and anti-progressive. The Catholic Church was at first hesitant to react, but from 1902 onward, big press campaigns were undertaken and administrative measures enacted in order to slow down the conversion movement.

As a result from the "Away from Rome" movement, the Protestant churches in Austria fell to an extent under the influence of German nationalists. Many Austrian Protestants had already been affected by the Protestant Prussian-dominated German Empire (Deutsches Reich), and the identification of German Protestantism with German nationalism (as opposed to the relatively pluralistic policy of the Catholic Habsburg monarchy) tended to make this tendency even stronger.

References

Anti-Catholic organizations
19th century in Austria-Hungary
Religious nationalism
German nationalism in Austria
Anti-Catholicism